Papua New Guinea have competed in seven editions of the Rugby League World Cup. Their best finish is the quarter-finals, which they have reached in two tournaments.

Tournament history

Tournaments

1985-1988 

1 France's 1987 away fixtures against Australia, New Zealand and Papua New Guinea were scratched and each team awarded two points as the French were unable to tour Australasia that year due to financial difficulties.

1989-1992

1995

2000

2008 

<

2013

2017

2021

References

External links 

Papua New Guinea national rugby league team
Rugby League World Cup